Sena Madureira is a municipality located in the center of the Brazilian state of Acre. It is 143 km from Rio Branco.
The oldest church in Acre state is located in Sena Madureira, the Nossa Senhora da Imaculada Conceição Church (1910).

Conservation

The municipality contains part of the Rio Acre Ecological Station.
It also contains part of the  Chico Mendes Extractive Reserve, a sustainable use environmental unit created in 1990.
It contains the  Macauã National Forest, a sustainable use conservation unit created in 1988.
It also contains the  São Francisco National Forest, a sustainable use conservation unit created in 2001.

It contains 98% of the  Cazumbá-Iracema Extractive Reserve, established in 2002 to support sustainable use of the natural resources by the traditional population.
The municipality contains about 12% of the  Chandless State Park, created in 2004, which protects an area of rainforest with bamboos that contains various endemic species of flora and fauna.
It contains about 27% of the  Antimary State Forest, a sustainable use conservation unit established in 1997.

Climate

References

Municipalities in Acre (state)